Andover Elementary School is a small, public elementary school in Andover, Maine.

With an enrollment of only 36 students in pre-kindergarten through fifth grade, the student-teacher ratio is one of the best in the state of Maine. Andover Elementary is part of the Maine School Administrative District 44.

References

External links
 Andover Elementary School (Andover, Maine) profile provided by greatschools.net
 Andover Elementary School (Andover, Maine) profile provided by schooltree.org

Public elementary schools in Maine
Schools in Oxford County, Maine